The Battle of Wuhan, popularly known to the Chinese as the Defense of Wuhan, and to the Japanese as the Capture of Wuhan, was a large-scale battle of the Second Sino-Japanese War. Engagements took place across vast areas of Anhui, Henan, Jiangxi, Zhejiang, and Hubei provinces over a period of four and a half months. It was the longest, the largest, and arguably the most significant battle in the early stages of the Second Sino-Japanese War. More than one million National Revolutionary Army troops from the Fifth and Ninth War Zone were put under the direct command of Chiang Kai-shek, defending Wuhan from the Central China Area Army of the Imperial Japanese Army led by Shunroku Hata. Chinese forces were also supported by the Soviet Volunteer Group, a group of volunteer pilots from Soviet Air Forces.

Although the battle ended with the eventual capture of Wuhan by the Japanese forces, it resulted in heavy casualties on both sides, as high as 1.2 million combined by some estimates. With the Japanese suffering their heaviest losses of the war, they decided to divert their attention to the north, which prolonged the war until the attack on Pearl Harbor. The end of the battle signaled the beginning of a strategic stalemate in the war, shifting from large pitched battles to localised struggles.

Background
On 7 July 1937, the Imperial Japanese Army (IJA) launched a full-scale invasion of China after the Marco Polo Bridge Incident. Both Beijing and Tianjin had fallen to the Japanese by 30 July, which exposed the rest of the North China Plain. To disrupt the Japanese invasion plans, the Chinese Nationalists decided to engage the Japanese in Shanghai, which opened a second front. The fighting lasted from 13 August to 12 November, with the Chinese suffering major casualties including "70 percent of Chiang Kai-shek's young officers." After the fall of Shanghai, Nanjing, which was the capital of China, was threatened directly by the Japanese forces. The Nationalists were thus forced to declare the capital an open city while they began the process of moving the capital to Chongqing.

With the fall of three major Chinese cities (Beijing, Tianjin, and Shanghai), there was a large number of refugees fleeing the fighting in addition to the government facilities and war supplies that needed to be transferred to Chongqing. Inadequacies in the transport systems prevented the government from being able to complete the transfer. Wuhan thus became the "de facto wartime capital" of the Republic of China for its strong industrial, economic, and cultural foundations. Assistance from the Soviet Union provided additional military and technical resources, including the Soviet Volunteer Group.

On the Japanese side, the IJA forces were drained by the large number and the extent of military operations since the beginning of the invasion. Reinforcements were thus dispatched to boost forces in the area, but that placed a considerable strain on the Japanese peacetime economy. That caused Prime Minister Fumimaro Konoe to reassemble his Cabinet in 1938 and to introduce the National Mobilization Law on 5 May that year, which moved Japan into a wartime economic state.

Although putting Japan's economy on a wartime footing slowed down the depletion of its treasury, the economic situation was not sustainable in the long term because of the cost of maintaining a military that could deal with the Soviet Union in a border conflict. The Japanese government thus wished to force the Chinese into submission quickly to gather resources to move on with its decision over northward and southward expansion. The Japanese commanders decided that Chinese resistance should be put to an end at Wuhan.

Importance of Wuhan

Wuhan, located halfway upstream of the Yangtze River, was the second-largest city in China, with a population of 1.5 million in late 1938. The Yangtze River and the Hanshui River divide the city into three regions, which include Wuchang, Hankou and Hanyang. Wuchang was the political center, Hankou was the commercial district, and Hanyang was the industrial area. After the completion of the Yuehan Railway, the importance of Wuhan as a major transportation hub in the interior of China was further established. The city also served as an important transit point for foreign aid moving inland from the southern ports.

After the Japanese capture of Nanjing, the bulk of the Nationalist government agencies and the military command headquarters were in Wuhan although the capital had been moved to Chongqing. Wuhan thus became the de facto wartime capital at the onset of the engagements in Wuhan. The Chinese war effort was thus focused on protecting Wuhan from being occupied by the Japanese. The Japanese government and the headquarters of the China Expeditionary Army expected Wuhan to fall, along with the Chinese resistance, "within a month or two."

Preparations for battle
In December 1937, the Military Affairs Commission was created to determine the battle plan for the defense of Wuhan. After the loss of Xuzhou, approximately 1.1 million men or 120 divisions of the National Revolutionary Army were redeployed. The commission decided to organize the defense around the Dabie Mountains, Poyang Lake, and the Yangtze River against the 200,000 Japanese in 20 divisions of the Imperial Japanese Army. Li Zongren and Bai Chongxi of the Fifth War Zone were assigned to defend the north of the Yangtze, ans Chen Cheng of the Ninth War Zone was tasked with defending the south. The First War Zone, located in the west of the Zhengzhou-Xinyang section of the Pinghan Railway, was given the task of stopping the Japanese forces coming from the North China Plain. Finally, Chinese troops in the Third War Zone, located between Wuhu, Anqing and Nanchang, were given the task to protect the Yuehan Railway.

After the Japanese occupied Xuzhou in May 1938, they sought actively to expand the scale of the invasion. The IJA decided to send a vanguard to occupy Anqing for use as a forward base for an attack on Wuhan, for its main force then to attack the area north of the Dabie Mountains moving along the Huai River, and to occupy Wuhan eventually by the way of the Wusheng Pass. Later, another detachment would move west along the Yangtze. However, the Yellow River flood forced the IJA to abandon its plan of attacking along the Huai, and it decided to attack along both banks of the Yangtze instead. On 4 May, the commander of the IJA forces, Shunroku Hata, organized approximately 350,000 men of the Second and Eleventh Armies to fight in and around Wuhan. Under him, Yasuji Okamura commanded five-and-a-half divisions of the Eleventh Army along both banks of the Yangtze in the main assault on Wuhan, and Prince Naruhiko Higashikuni commanded four-and-a-half divisions of the Second Army along the northern foot of the Dabie Mountains to assist the assault. The forces were augmented by 120 ships of the Third Fleet of the Imperial Japanese Navy under Koshirō Oikawa, more than 500 planes of the Imperial Japanese Army Air Service, and five divisions of Japanese forces from the Central China Area Army to guard the areas in and around Shanghai, Beijing, Hangzhou, and other important cities, which would protect the back of the Japanese forces and complete the preparation for the battle.

Prelude

The Battle of Wuhan was preceded by a Japanese air strike on 18 February 1938 that was known as the "2.18 Air Battle" and ended by Chinese forces repelling the attack. On 24 March, the Diet of Japan passed the National Mobilization Law, which authorized unlimited war funding. As part of the law, the National Service Draft Ordinance also allowed the conscription of civilians. On 29 April, the Japanese air force launched major air strikes on Wuhan to celebrate Emperor Shōwa's birthday. The Chinese, with prior intelligence, were well prepared. The battle was known as the "4.29 Air Battle" and was one of the most intense air battles of the Second Sino-Japanese War.

After the fall of Xuzhou in May 1938, the Japanese planned an extensive invasion of Hankou and the takeover of Wuhan, and intended to destroy the main force of the National Revolutionary Army. The Chinese, on the other hand, were building up their defensive efforts by massing troops in the Wuhan area. They also set up an defensive line in Henan to delay the Japanese forces coming from Xuzhou. However, the disparity in Chinese and Japanese troop strength caused that line of defense collapsed quickly.

In an attempt to win more time for the preparation of the defense of Wuhan, the Chinese opened up the dikes of the Yellow River in Huayuankou, Zhengzhou on 9 June. The flood, now known as the 1938 Yellow River flood, forced the Japanese to delay their attack on Wuhan. However, it also caused around 500,000 to 900,000 civilian deaths by flooding many cities in northern China.

Major engagements

Air war and pre-emptive strikes

On 18 February 1938, an Imperial Japanese Navy Air Service (IJNAF) strike-force composed of at least 11 A5M fighters of the 12th and 13th Kōkūtais, led by Lieutenant Takashi Kaneko, and 15 G3M bombers of the Kanoya Kokutai, led by Lieutenant Commander Sugahisa Tuneru, on a raid against Wuhan engaged in battle with 19 Chinese Air Force I-15 fighters of the 22nd and 23rd Pursuit Squadrons and 10 I-16 fighters of the 21st PS, all under the overall command of the 4th Pursuit Group CO Captain Li Guidan, as well as several more mix of Polikarpov fighters of the Soviet Volunteer Group. The 4th Group fighters would claim at least 4 of the A5Ms, and the Soviet group claimed no less than 3 of the A5Ms shot down. Both the Japanese fighter group commander, Lieutenant Kaneko, and the Chinese fighter group commander, Captain Li, were Killed in action in the battle. A largely-intact A5M fighter plane that was downed in the battle was recovered with a damaged engine, and it was the second intact A5M to be recovered, repaired, and flight-tested in the war, the first recovered-intact A5M having been one downed by Colonel Gao Zhihang during an air battle over Nanjing on 12 October 1937.

On 3 August 1938, 52 Chinese fighters, with 20 I-15s, 13 I-16s, 11 Gloster Gladiators, and 7 Hawk IIIs intercepted at least 29 A5M fighters and 18 G3M bombers over Hankow. The former Guangxi warlord air force pilot Zhu Jiaxun and his squadron-mate, He Jermin, along with the Chinese-American fighter pilots Arthur Chin and Louie Yim-qun, all flying the Gladiators, would claim at least four of the A5Ms to be shot down that day.

South of Yangtze River

On 15 June, the Japanese made a naval landing and captured Anqing, which signaled the onset of the Battle of Wuhan. On the southern bank of the Yangtze River, the Chinese Ninth War Zone had one regiment stationed west of Poyang Lake and another stationed in Jiujiang. On 24 June, the Japanese forces made a surprise landing in Madang, while the main force of the Japanese Eleventh Army attacked along southern shore of the Yangtze River. Madang quickly fell to the Japanese, which opened up the route to Jiujiang.

The Chinese defenders tried to resist the Japanese advance, but they could not repel the landing force of the Japanese 106th Division, which captured Jiujiang on the 26th. The Japanese Namita detachment moved westward along the river, landed northeast of Ruichang on 10 August, and mounted an assault on the city. The defending NRA 2nd Corps was reinforced by the 32nd Army Group and initially halted the Japanese attack. However, when the Japanese 9th Division entered the fray, the Chinese defenders were exhausted, and Ruichang was captured on the 24th.

The Japanese 9th Division and the Namita detachment continued to move along the river, and the Japanese 27th Division invaded Ruoxi at the same time. The Chinese 30th and 18th Corps resisted along the Ruichang-Ruoxi Road and the surrounding area, which resulted in a stalemate for more than a month until the Japanese 27th Division captured Ruoxi on 5 October. The Japanese forces then turned to strike northeast, captured Xintanpu in Hubei on the 18th, and moved towards Dazhi.

In the meantime, other Japanese forces and their supporting river fleet continued their advance westwards along the Yangtze, encountering resistance from the defending Chinese 31st Army and 32nd Army Group west of Ruichang. When the town of Madang and Fujin Mountain, both in Yangxin County, were captured. The Chinese 2nd Corps deployed the 6th, 56th, 75th and 98th Armies, along with the 30th Army Group, to strengthen the defense of the Jiangxi region. The battle continued until 22 October when the Chinese lost other towns in Yangxin County, Dazhi and Hubei Provinces. The Japanese 9th Division and Namita detachment were now approaching Wuchang.

Wanjialing

While the Japanese Army attacked Ruichang, the 106th Division moved along the Nanxun Railway, now known as Nanchang-Jiujiang, on the south side. The defending Chinese 4th Army, 8th Army Group, and 29th Army Group relied on the advantageous terrain of Lushan and north of Nanxun Railway to resist. As a result, the Japanese offensive suffered a setback. On 20 August, the Japanese 101st Division crossed the Poyang Lake from Hukou County to reinforce the 106th Division, which breached the Chinese 25th Army's defensive line and captured Xinzhi. They attempted to occupy De'an County and Nanchang, together with the 106th Division, to protect the southern flank of the Japanese Army, which was advancing westward. Xue Yue, the commander-in-chief of the Chinese First Corps, used the 4th, 29th, 66th, and 74th Armies to link with the 25th Army and engaged the Japanese in a fierce battle at Madang and north of De'an, which brought the battle to a stalemate.

Towards the end of September, four regiments of the Japanese 106th Division circled into the Wanjialing region, west of De'an. Xue Yue commanded the Chinese 4th, 66th, and 77th Armies to flank the Japanese. The 27th Division of the Japanese Army attempted to reinforce the position but was ambushed and repulsed by the Chinese 32nd Army led by Shang Zhen in Baisui Street, west of Wanjialing. On 7 October, the Chinese Army mounted a final large-scale assault to encircle the Japanese troops. The fierce battle continued for three days, and all of the Japanese counterattacks were repelled by the Chinese.

By 10 October, the Japanese 106th Division, as well as the 9th, 27th, and 101st Divisions, which had gone to reinforce it, had suffered heavy casualties. The Aoki, Ikeda, Kijima, and Tsuda Brigades were also annihilated in the encirclement. With Japanese forces in the area losing combat command capabilities, hundreds of officers were airdropped into the area. Of the four Japanese divisions which had gone into the battle, only around 1,500 men made it out of the encirclement. That was later called the Victory of Wanjialing by the Chinese.

In 2000, Japanese military historians admitted the heavy damages that the 9th, 27th, 101st, and 106th Divisions and their subordinate units had suffered during the Battle of Wanjialing, which multiplied the number of war dead honoured in Japanese shrines. They also said that the damages had not been admitted during the war to maintain public morale and confidence in the war effort.

North of Yangtze River
In Shandong, 1,000 soldiers under Shi Yousan, who had defected multiple times to rivaling warlord cliques and was then independent, occupied Jinan and held it for a few days. Guerrillas also briefly held Yantai. The area east of Changzhou all the way to Shanghai was controlled by another non-government Chinese force, led by Dai Li, who used guerrilla tactics in the suburbs of Shanghai and across the Huangpu River. The force was made up of secret society members of the Green Gang and the Tiandihui and killed spies and traitors. It lost more than 100 men during its operations. On 13 August, members of the force sneaked into the Japanese air base at Hongqiao and raised a Chinese flag.

While those factions were active, the Japanese 6th Division breached the defensive lines of Chinese 31st and 68th Army on 24 July and captured Taihu, Susong, and Huangmei Counties on 3 August. As the Japanese continued to move westward, the Chinese 4th Army of the Fifth War Zone deployed its main force in Guangji, Hubei and Tianjia Town to intercept the Japanese offensive. The 11th Army Group and the 68th Army were ordered to form a line of defense in Huangmei county, and the 21st and 29th Army Group, as well as the 26th Army, moved south to flank the Japanese.

The Chinese recaptured Taihu on 27 August and Susong on 28 August. However, with Japanese reinforcements arriving on 30 August, the Chinese 11th Army Group and the 68th Army were unsuccessful in their counteroffensives. They retreated to Guangji County to continue resisting the Japanese forces along with the Chinese 26th, 55th, and 86th Armies. The Chinese 4th Army Group ordered the 21st and 29th Army Groups to flank the Japanese from northeast of Huangmei, but they were unable to stop the Japanese advance. Guangji was captured on 6 September. On 8 September, Guangji was recovered by the Chinese 4th Corps, but Wuxue was lost the same day.

The Japanese Army then lay siege to Tianjia Town Fort. The Chinese 4th Corps sent the 2nd Army to reinforce the 87th Army and the 26th, 48th, and 86th Armies to flank the Japanese. However, they were beaten back and suffered many casualties at the hands of the battle-hardened Japanese, who had greater firepower. The Tianjia Town Fort was captured on the 29th, and the Japanese continued to attack westwards by capturing Huangpo on 24 October and were now approaching Hankou.

Dabie Mountains
In the north of the Dabie Mountains, the Chinese 3rd Army Group of the Fifth War Zone stationed the 19th and 51st Army Groups and the 77th Army in the Liuan and Huoshan regions in Anqing. The 71st Army was tasked with the defense of Fujin Mountain and Gushi County in Henan. The Chinese 2nd Group Army was stationed in Shangcheng, Henan and Macheng, Hubei. The Chinese 27th Army Group and the 59th Army were stationed in the Yellow River region, and the 17th Army was deployed in the Xinyang region to organize the defensive works.

The Japanese attacked in late August with the 2nd Army Group marching from Hefei by two different routes. The 13th Division, on the southern route, breached the Chinese 77th Army's defensive line and captured Huoshan, when it turned towards Yejiaji. The nearby Chinese 71st Army and the 2nd Army Group made use of their existing positions to resist the Japanese onslaught, which halted the Japanese 13th Division. The 16th Division was thus called in to reinforce the attack. On 16 September, the Japanese captured Shangcheng. The defenders retreated southwards out of the city and used their strategic strongholds in the Dabie Mountains to continue the resistance. On 24 October, the Japanese occupied Macheng.

The 10th Division was the main force in the northern route. It breached the Chinese 51st Army's defensive line and captured Liuan on 28 August. On 6 September, it captured Gushi and continued its advance westwards. The Chinese 27th Army Group and the 59th Army gathered in the Yellow River region to resist. After ten days of fierce fighting, the Japanese crossed the Yellow River on 19 September. On the 21st, the Japanese 10th Division defeated the Chinese 17th Group Army and 45th Army and captured Lushan.

The 10th Division then continued to move westward but met a Chinese counterattack east of Xinyang and was forced to withdraw back to Lushan. The Japanese 2nd Army Group ordered the 3rd Division to assist the 10th Division in taking Xinyang. On 6 October, the 3rd Division circled back to Xintang and captured the Liulin station of Pinghan Railway. On the 12th, the Japanese 2nd Army captured Xinyang and moved south of the Pinghan Railway to attack Wuhan, together with the 11th Army.

Fighting in Guangzhou

The continuing stalemate around Wuhan and the continued influx of foreign aid to Chinese forces from ports in the south made the IJA decide to deploy three reserve divisions to pressure the naval shipping lines. It thus decided to occupy the Guangdong port by an amphibious landing. Because of the fighting in Wuhan, a significant portion of Chinese forces in Guangzhou had been transferred elsewhere. As such, the pace of the occupation was much smoother than expected, and Guangzhou fell to the Japanese on 21 October.

The loss of the Guangzhou area meant the loss of the main supply line of foreign aid to central China—the two railways linking Kowloon to Guangzhou and Guangzhou to Wuhan. Thus, the strategic value of Wuhan was greatly diminished. The Chinese Army, hoping to save its remaining forces, thus abandoned the city on 25 October. The Japanese Army captured Wuchang and Hankou on 26 October and captured Hanyang on the 27th, which concluded the campaign in Wuhan.

Use of chemical weapons
According to Yoshiaki Yoshimi and Seiya Matsuno, Emperor Shōwa authorized by specific orders (rinsanmei) the use of chemical weapons against the Chinese. During the Battle of Wuhan, Prince Kan'in Kotohito transmitted the emperor's orders to use toxic gas 375 times, from August to October 1938, despite the 1899 Hague Declaration IV, 2 - Declaration on the Use of Projectiles the Object of Which is the Diffusion of Asphyxiating or Deleterious Gases, Article 23 (a) of the 1907 Hague Convention IV - The Laws and Customs of War on Land, and Article 171 of the Versailles Peace Treaty. According to another memorandum discovered by the historian Yoshiaki Yoshimi, Prince Naruhiko Higashikuni authorized the use of poison gas against the Chinese on 16 August 1938. A resolution adopted by the League of Nations on 14 May condemned the use of toxic gas by the Imperial Japanese Army.

Japan made heavy use of chemical weapons against China to make up for its lack of numbers in combat and because China did not have any poison gas stockpiles of its own to retaliate. Japan used poison gas at Hankow in the Battle of Wuhan to break fierce Chinese resistance after conventional Japanese assaults had been repelled by Chinese defenders. Rana Mitter wrote, "Under General Xue Yue, some 100,000 Chinese troops pushed back Japanese forces at Huangmei. At the fortress of Tianjiazhen, thousands of men fought until the end of September, with Japanese victory assured only with the use of poison gas. Yet even now, top Chinese generals seemed unable to work with each other at Xinyang, Li Zongren's Guangxi troops were battered to exhaustion. They expected that the troops of Hu Zongnan, another general close to Chiang Kai-shek, would relieve them, but instead Hu led his troops away from the city." Japan also used poison gas against Chinese Muslim armies at the Battle of Wuyuan and the Battle of West Suiyuan.

Aftermath
After four months of intense fighting, both the Chinese Air Force and the Chinese Navy were decimated since the IJA had captured Wuhan. However, the main Chinese land force remained largely intact, and the IJA was significantly weakened. The Battle of Wuhan bought more time for Chinese forces and equipment in Central China to move farther inland to the mountainous fortress of Chongqing and lay the foundation for an extended war of resistance. Wuhan and Hubei Province now provided the Japanese with new airbases and logistics to support the massive "joint-strike force" terror-bombing campaign against Chongqing and Chengdu under the codename Operation 100. After the capture of Wuhan, the IJA advance in central China was slowed down significantly by multiple battles around Changsha in 1939, 1941, and 1942. No more major offensives were launched until Operation Ichi-Go in 1944; between 1942 and 1944, limited Japanese offensives were mounted for the sole purpose of training recruits. The Chinese managed to preserve their strength to continue resisting the weakened IJA, which reduced its capability to respond to rising tensions between Japan and the Soviet Union at the northeastern borders.

See also
 Air warfare of the Second Sino-Japanese War

References

Citations

Bibliography

 
 
 
 
 
 
 

Conflicts in 1938
Battles and operations of World War II
Wuhan 1938
History of Wuhan
China in World War II
1938 in China
1938 in Japan